This is the list of cathedrals in Switzerland sorted by denomination.

Roman Catholic 

Cathedrals of the Roman Catholic Church in Switzerland:
 Cathedral of Sts. Ursus and Victor in Solothurn
 Basilica of Mary of the Assumption in Chur
 Cathedral of St. Nicholas in Fribourg
 Cathedral of St. Lawrence in Lugano
 Benedictine Abbey Cathedral of St. Maurice in Einsiedeln
 Abbey of St. Maurice in Saint-Maurice-d'Agaune
 Cathedral of Sts. Gall and Otmar in St. Gallen
 Sion Cathedral (Cathédrale Notre-Dame du Glarier) in Sion

Reformed

 Lausanne Cathedral (largest gothic building in Switzerland)
 Bern Minster (tallest cathedral in Switzerland)
 St. Pierre Cathedral in Geneva
 Basel Minster

Eastern Orthodox
Cathedral of the Russian Orthodox Church Outside Russia:
 Holy Cross Cathedral in Geneva

Notes and references

See also 

 List of castles and fortresses in Switzerland
 Lists of cathedrals by country
 Lists of tourist attractions in Switzerland

Cathedrals in Switzerland
Switzerland
Cathedrals
Cathedrals